Nicholas Lee Wells (born May 22, 1996) is an American soccer player who most recently played as a defender for South Georgia Tormenta in USL League One.

References

External links
 
 Georgia Southern Eagles profile

1996 births
Living people
American soccer players
Association football defenders
Georgia Southern Eagles men's soccer players
People from Stockbridge, Georgia
Soccer players from Georgia (U.S. state)
Tormenta FC players
USL League One players
USL League Two players